Artashes Babalian (November 17, 1886 – August 1, 1959) was an Armenian doctor, politician and public figure who served as the minster of social protection in the government of the First Republic of Armenia.  Babalian was born in 1886 in Shushi, Karabakh. Babalian was also a member of the Armenian Revolutionary Federation.

References

External links
Babalyan on Orientica Encyclopaedia

1886 births
1959 deaths
Politicians from Shusha
Armenian physicians
People of the First Republic of Armenia
Ministers of Social Protection of the First Republic of Armenia
20th-century physicians
Soviet emigrants to Iran